Rachael Adhiambo Mbogo (born December 20, 1982) is a Kenyan rugby sevens player. She competed for the Kenyan women's national rugby sevens team at the 2016 Summer Olympics. She also was in Kenya's squad for the 2016 France Women's Sevens.

References

External links 
 Player Profile
 

1982 births
Living people
Female rugby sevens players
Rugby sevens players at the 2016 Summer Olympics
Olympic rugby sevens players of Kenya
Kenya international rugby sevens players
Kenya international women's rugby sevens players